Kusa is a town and the administrative center of Kusinsky District in Chelyabinsk Oblast, Russia, located on the Kusa and Ay Rivers,  west of Chelyabinsk, the administrative center of the oblast. Population:

History
It was founded in 1778. Town status was granted to it on January 8, 1943.

Administrative and municipal status
Within the framework of administrative divisions, Kusa serves as the administrative center of Kusinsky District. As an administrative division, it is, together with three rural localities, incorporated within Kusinsky District as the Town of Kusa. As a municipal division, the Town of Kusa is incorporated within Kusinsky Municipal District as Kusinskoye Urban Settlement.

Climate

References

Notes

Sources

Cities and towns in Chelyabinsk Oblast
Ufa Governorate